Nick Butler is a visiting professor at King's College London and the founding chairman of the Kings Policy Institute. He chairs Promus Associates, The Sure Chill Company. From 2007 to 2009 he was chairman of the Cambridge Centre for Energy Studies. He was a special adviser to the former  British prime minister Gordon Brown from 2009 to 2010.  He served as a non-executive director of Cambridge Econometrics from 2010 to 2018. He was appointed in 2018 to the expert panel of advisers for The Faraday Institution, which works on the development of batteries and energy storage. Having served as a Member of the Strategic Advisory Council of the Norwegian state company Equinor (formerly Statoil), he is currently editor of the Energy Agenda for the Norwegian-based energy organisation ONS.

Butler was educated at Blackpool Grammar School, and graduated in economics from Trinity College, Cambridge. He joined the British oil firm BP in 1977, ultimately becoming group vice president for strategy and policy development from 2002 to 2006.

He is a vice president of the Fabian Society, having been chairman in 1987 and treasurer from 1982 to 2012. He is a former chairman of the Young Fabians. He was chairman of the Centre for European Reform, which he co-founded with David Miliband from 1994 to 2009, a member of the President's international advisory board at Yale University from 2007 to 2014, and a founder member of British American successor generation project.  He was a parliamentary candidate for the Labour Party, standing for Lincoln in the 1987 and 1992 general elections.

He is a member of the advisory board of OMFIF – the organisation of Financial Institutions and Sovereign Wealth Funds. He served as non-executive chairman of the energy technology business Agni Inc from 2008 until February 2009.

He is a vice president of the Hay-on-Wye literary festival and a member and chairman of the executive committee of the Athenaeum.

He contributes to the Financial Times on energy and power and for the Nikkei Asian Review.

He is married to Rosaleen Hughes and has one daughter. They live in Clapham, South London.

Publications
European Universities – Renaissance or Decay (with Richard Lambert, 2006)
The International Grain Trade (1985)
The IMF – Time for Reform (1982)

References

External links
Nick Butler at Judge Business School
Cambridge Centre for Energy Studies at Judge Business School
Nick Butler's blog at the Financial Times

Living people
Year of birth missing (living people)
Alumni of Trinity College, Cambridge
Academics of King's College London
People from Lincoln, England
Labour Party (UK) parliamentary candidates
Chairs of the Fabian Society
Treasurers of the Fabian Society